The Republic of Lower Canada was a break-away state proclaimed in the aftermath of the 1837 Rebellions. The defeat of the rebellion meant that the state could never be properly established.

History

Origins
A British colony since 1760, Canada was divided in two distinct entities in 1791: Lower Canada, mainly inhabited by the descendants of the colonists of New France, and Upper Canada, mainly inhabited by British colonists and American Loyalists who established themselves as refugees of the American Revolution. Each entity had its own elected assembly.

The Francophones, who were the majority in Lower Canada, wished to take into their own hands important decisions regarding the administration of the colony. However, a massive frustration emerged because the assembly was soon restricted to an aesthetical role, a rubber-stamp; the real legislative and executive power was concentrated in the hands of the Governor-General,  chosen by London, who often misunderstood or belittled the interests of the people of Lower Canada, which were at times contradictory to those of the British colonial authorities.

The unstable political situation, lack of individual ministerial responsibility of the colonial government; as well as the economic crisis and the recent independence of the United States and of Latin American states led the people of Lower Canada, in the autumn of 1837, to the Lower Canada Rebellion. The poorly armed, untrained and out-numbered Patriotes were quickly defeated by the British Army. The survivors sought refuge in the United States.

Founding Fathers
On 2 January 1838, Robert Nelson as well as a good number of refugees such as Louis-Joseph Papineau, O'Callaghan, Chartier, Rodier, Malhiot, Côté, Bouthillier, Davignon and Gagnon assembled at Middlebury in Vermont to plan a military invasion of Lower Canada. The Patriotes present voted in favour of the quick establishment of a Provisional Government and launched an attack from the safety of the United States. Some voted against this venture, such as Papineau, who judged it doomed from the start without the help of a military power such as the United States or France. This led to some disagreement between the two rebel leaders.

Declaration of Independence and 1838 Invasions
The first invasion of Lower Canada was attempted on 28 February 1838. The six to seven hundred rebels, led by the two doctors Coté and Nelson, left Vermont with the goal of crossing the border. They soon arrived at a camp situated approximately 1.5 kilometres from the border and Robert Nelson was given the rank of General of the Army and elected President of the Republic of Lower Canada. Nelson then read the Declaration of Independence of Lower Canada, which was very progressive for the time. Lower Canada was unilaterally declared an independent Republic and its people declared absolved of all allegiance to the British crown. The state laid down enjoyed provisions such as the Separation of Church and State, equal rights for all citizens, abolition of the feudal seigneurial system, abolition of the death penalty, liberty of the press, and most notably the equality of the French and English languages including official bilingualism.

Unfortunately for the rebels, they were quickly beaten back by the British army, and the American government, under British pressure, decided to stay neutral, not permitting such an invasion to be mounted from their territory. Nelson and Coté were arrested at the border and charged for violations of neutrality, then released. They took this as a lesson in organization and secrecy, noting they could never hope to match the British army in open warfare with their small numbers and resources. This led to the creation of a guerrilla organization named the Frères chasseurs under the guise of a hunting club, with the goal of overthrowing the governments of Upper and Lower Canada and to establish sovereign, democratic republican institutions in their place. Its organization was hierarchical and was led by a "Great Eagle" (equivalent to a Major-General). He led "Eagles" who each represented a district of the province and led a company. The "Eagles" chose two men as "Beavers" (equivalent to a Captain) who in turn each had under their orders 5 "Snowshoes" (Corporals). Each of the "Snowshoes" led 9 men with the title of "Hunters". It was financed by supporters in Lower Canada and the United States. Wild rumours began to roam regarding the numerical strength of the rebels. John Colborne spoke of tens of thousands, others believed that each parish of Lower Canada had their recruiting office.

An insurrection was planned for 3 November 1838. On that day the rebels assembled along the border, at Lacolle,  Napierville and Chateaugay. Some impatient groups did not wait for Nelson's orders and began attacking piecemeal. At Beauharnois a group occupied a seiugneurie and another seized a steamship to convert it into a warship. The initial plan was to seize Beauharnois, Chateaugay, la Prairie, St-Jean, Chambly, Boucherville and Sorel. Nelson, commanding 800 men, was to go up the Richelieu valley to capture St-Jean and advance to Montreal. Montreal, Trois-Rivières, and Quebec City would be successively attacked, drawing upon increasing amounts of manpower and weapons as the population would join them.

Nothing went according to plan. In Montreal, authorities quickly responded and arrested many local leaders. Other Patriotes, seeing that the promised weapons failed to arrive, marched to the Native reservation of Kahnawake to seize the Natives' arsenal. They failed and many were made prisoner to be delivered to the British. An American ship which was to deliver weapons was intercepted by a group of Loyalist volunteers. Other weapons which had been hidden at Rouse's Point in the United States were seized by American authorities. Apprehending that the operation was failing, he led his men onwards to Odelltown. In Lacolle, a rumour said that Nelson had tried to run away during the night only to be caught by his men, the doctor convincing them that he was merely inspecting the troops.

On 10 November, they attacked Odelltown. The colonial militia was quickly reinforced and the rebels had to pull back. Defeated, they retreated to the United States. Nelson himself had fled before the battle was over.

Epilogue

Later that year, Nelson met many leaders of the Patriot movement in Swanton, Vermont, and began to plan border skirmishes to draw the United States into a conflict with the British Empire. However, the 1842 Webster-Ashburton Treaty destroyed the last hopes of getting American assistance to liberate the French Canadians from British colonialism. Ruined, destitute, and his reputation broken, he refused to return to Lower Canada despite an amnesty and stayed in the United States, forsaking politics until his death in 1873 in Staten Island.

Legacy
Lower Canada experienced during and after the rebellions great hardships and oppression and exploitation that would last until the Quiet Revolution, including a systematic program of assimilation; the mandatory use of English in all public matters and business; as well as an economic recession. The Rebellions lead to many more conflicts most notably the 1845 Rebellion Losses Bill which caused enraged Orangist and Tory Anglophones to burn the Building of Parliament in Montreal, which lead to the construction of Ottawa. A large number of people were drawn to the promise of a better life in the United States to form the large majority of the French American community, concentrated mostly in the industrial north.

The 1837 and 1838 Rebellions received increased interest following the rise of the Quebec independence movement and many of their symbols are used today to represent Quebec nationalism. The 1838 attempt at separation is often overshadowed by the much more violent, general insurrection that occurred a year earlier.

See also
 Patriote movement
 Republicanism in Canada
 Executions at the Pied-du-Courant Prison
 History of Quebec

External links
 Account of the events (Republiquelibre.org (French))

1838 in Lower Canada
Lower Canada
Lower Canada Rebellion
Lower Canada
Lower Canada